Levar Coppin, also known as "LV", is an American DJ, producer, and songwriter, best known for his involvement in production outfit Sean C & LV, which was linked to Fat Joe's New York City-based hip-hop collective Terror Squad, and is presently linked to Bad Boy Records' The Hitmen (production team). Coppin is also known for his production and songwriting contributions to Jay-Z's 2007 album American Gangster and various Ghostface Killah projects, as well as his writing contributions to Beyoncé's 2022 album Renaissance.

Songwriting and production credits
Credits are courtesy of Discogs, Tidal, Apple Music, and AllMusic.

Awards and nominations

References 

African-American record producers
African-American songwriters
American hip hop record producers
Living people
Year of birth missing (living people)